Nokia 3600 may refer to:

 Nokia 3650, a 2002 phone marketed in North America as the Nokia 3600.
 Nokia 3600 slide, a 2008 phone